Robert Pierson (buried 23 January 1673) was rector of St Mary's, Oldswinford, Worcestershire.

Robert Pierson is largely undocumented, being omitted from Nash's list of rectors of St Mary's, Oldswinford.   The two sources for his life are the parish records of his last church and the writings of the Puritan historian Edmund Calamy.

Robert Pierson succeeded Gervase Bryan as rector of St Mary's, Oldswinford after the latter was ejected in 1662.  He died in post and was buried in his churchyard.

According to Calamy (a somewhat partial historian), Pierson had Puritan sympathies both showing sympathy for his predecessor (who remained in Oldswinford after his ejection) and expressing regret at his decision to conform.   Calamy also reports that Pierson offended some of his parishioners by criticising the deceased and suffered ill health while preaching which eventually led to his death.

Pierson was one of the founder feoffes [trustees] of Old Swinford Hospital school, founded by Pierson's patron, Thomas Foley (died 1677).

References

Year of birth missing
1673 deaths